Harry James Hillaker (9 May 1919 - 8 February 2009) was an American aeronautical engineer, who is credited as the main designer and originator of the F-16 Fighting Falcon aircraft.

Early life
He was born in Flint, Michigan, attending Flint Northern High School.

He studied Aeronautical Engineering at the University of Michigan-Flint.

Career

Consolidated Aircraft
He started at Consolidated Aircraft in 1941. 

He worked on the Convair B-58 Hustler.

General Dynamics
He was the chief project engineer for the F-16 aircraft, overseeing the testing of the prototype aircraft, to fulfil the needs of the Lightweight Fighter program. The prototype started as the General Dynamics Model 401, to become the YF-16, beginning around 1971.

The prototype arrived at Edwards Air Force Base in California on 8 January 1974, taking to the air on 2 February 1974, flown by Phil Oestricher.

In January 1975, the YF-16 had been selected for the Lightweight Fighter program. He retired in 1985.

Personal life
He married on 2 October 1943, and had six children. His wife died in 2017. He died aged 89 on Sunday 8 February 2009 in Texas.

See also
 Mikhail Simonov, designer of the Sukhoi Su-27
 Robert H. Widmer, designer of the F-111

References

External links
 F-16 Design Origins

1909 births
2009 deaths
American aerospace engineers
Engineers from Michigan
General Dynamics F-16 Fighting Falcon
People from Flint, Michigan
University of Michigan–Flint alumni
University of Michigan College of Engineering alumni